Marcus Clarke was an Australian novelist best known for writing For the Term of His Natural Life.

Marcus Clarke may also refer to:
Marcus Clarke (doctor) (1912–2000), Australian doctor in Borneo, interned by the Japanese during World War II, who wrote about his experiences
Marcus Clarke (puppeteer) (born 1967), British actor, puppeteer and writer

See also
Marcus Clark & Co., an Australian department store
 Marcus R. Clark (born 1956), Republican member of the Louisiana Supreme Court